Drinić is a surname. Notable people with the surname include:

Anka Drinić (born 1924), Yugoslav gymnast
Damir Drinić (born 1989), Serbian footballer
Darko Drinić (born 1981), Serbian footballer